This is the list of presidents of Sardinia since 1949.

Elected by the Regional Council (1949–1994)

Directly-elected presidents (since 1994)

Politics of Sardinia
Government of Sardinia
Sardinia